Zagreb Zoo is a  zoo located within Maksimir Park in Zagreb, Croatia and is across the street from Zagreb's Maksimir Stadium. It is one of three zoo parks in the country.

Zagreb Zoo is a member of both the European and the World Association of Zoos and Aquariums and is a participant in the European Endangered Species Programme.

History

The zoo opened its doors on June 27, 1925. Reconstruction of the old zoo began in 1990. By October 2016, first part of the Zoo reconstruction and modernization was finished.

Animals
The zoo is home to 2,225 animals representing 275 species.

ANIMAL EXHIBITS
Leopard world

North China leopard

Amur leopard

Snow leopard

Madagascar

Ring tailed lemur

Black and white ruffed lemur

Australia enclouser

Red-necked Wallaby

Magpie-goose

Black swan

Emu

Sea Lion bay

California Sea Lion

Red panda Trail

Red panda

Terrapin

Monkey house

Guereza

Sacred langur

Black howler

Gallery

References

External links

Novi projekti i sve više sadržaja za posjetitelje 
Gradi se novi zoološki vrt, gotovo četiri puta veći od maksimirskog! 

1925 establishments in Croatia
Zoos in Croatia
Culture in Zagreb
Zoos established in 1925
Maksimir
Tourist attractions in Zagreb